Venersborg is a census-designated place (CDP) in Clark County, Washington, United States. The population was 3,745 at the 2010 census, up from 3,274 at the 2000 census.

History
The community was established as "Venner's Villas" in the late 19th and early 20th centuries when a land entrepreneur named J. C. Lanerberg purchased land from various sources (the government, the railroad, and other landowners). He divided the land into  lots, and marketed it in large urban areas throughout the United States, highlighting its resemblance to rural Sweden. The flyers were written in Swedish so, predictably, the first settlers who arrived in the early 1900s were mostly of Swedish ancestry. The growth of nearby Vancouver and Portland led to an influx of new residents in the 1960s.

The land was originally heavily timbered. A number of farms and orchards were established in the early 20th century, some of which still exist. Some old farm orchards have old heirloom apple varieties including some rare ones.

The community is still rural. There are only three non-residential buildings in town. The single commercial establishment, the Venersborg Store, reopened in 2008 but closed back up in 2013.

The members of the Venersborg Community Club take care of the Venersborg Schoolhouse which was built in 1912. This one-room schoolhouse is on the National Register of Historic Places and the Washington State Heritage Register. It is the oldest continuously operating community building in the state of Washington. The schoolhouse is the location for many annual events: the Sweethearts' Dance in February, Spring Potluck, December Wreath Making party, Spring Seed Swap & Giveaway. All Venersborg residents are invited to these events and encouraged to volunteer.

The Venersborg Church is a small and lively independent community church. Every Independence Day, they hold a small gathering.

Geography
Venersborg is located in central Clark County at  (45.782723, -122.462052). It is bordered to the northwest by Lewisville, to the west by the city of Battle Ground, and to the south by Salmon Creek, with the community of Hockinson across it from the southwest portion of Venersborg.

Demographics
As of the census of 2000, there were 3,274 people, 1,018 households, and 899 families residing in the CDP. The population density was 305.6 people per square mile (118.0/km2). There were 1,054 housing units at an average density of 98.4/sq mi (38.0/km2). The racial makeup of the CDP was 97.16% White, 0.18% African American, 0.15% Native American, 0.43% Asian, 0.06% Pacific Islander, 0.15% from other races, and 1.86% from two or more races. Hispanic or Latino of any race were 1.86% of the population. 23.2% were of German, 10.8% American, 10.2% English, 9.4% Finnish, 7.7% Swedish and 5.9% Irish ancestry according to Census 2000.

There were 1,018 households, out of which 43.6% had children under the age of 18 living with them, 81.1% were married couples living together, 4.6% had a female householder with no husband present, and 11.6% were non-families. 9.1% of all households were made up of individuals, and 2.7% had someone living alone who was 65 years of age or older. The average household size was 3.21 and the average family size was 3.41.

In the CDP, the age distribution of the population shows 32.7% under the age of 18, 6.5% from 18 to 24, 27.2% from 25 to 44, 27.1% from 45 to 64, and 6.6% who were 65 years of age or older. The median age was 37 years. For every 100 females, there were 103.6 males. For every 100 females age 18 and over, there were 100.7 males.

The median income for a household in the CDP was $65,912, and the median income for a family was $70,031. Males had a median income of $51,120 versus $30,806 for females. The per capita income for the CDP was $21,610. None of the families and 0.7% of the population were living below the poverty line, including no under eighteens and 5.0% of those over 64.

References

External links
Venersborg Schoolhouse
Friendly Haven Rise Farm
Venersborg Church

Census-designated places in Clark County, Washington
Census-designated places in Washington (state)